Jun Ohnishi is a Grand Prix motorcycle racer from Japan.

Career statistics

By season

Races by year
(key)

References

External links
 Profile on motogp.com

Japanese motorcycle racers
Living people
125cc World Championship riders
Year of birth missing (living people)